Woodpark is a small neighbourhood in Bay Ward, in the west end of Ottawa, Ontario, Canada.  It is bounded in the north by Richmond Road, to the East by Woodroffe Avenue north, in the South by Carling Avenue and in the west by the Sir John A. Macdonald Parkway. The total population of the neighbourhood according to the Canada 2016 Census was 2,191.

It is largely residential with commercial only on Carling Avenue and a small portion of Woodroffe. There is only one small park, New Orchard Park, within its boundaries, but both the Parkway and part of the Byron Strip are adjacent to it. It has no schools and one church. The church is the Ottawa Reformed Presbyterian Church located at 466 Woodland Ave. There is a Community Association which can be accessed at www.woodpark.ca

The community was built in the 1940s and 1950s. Many apartments and condominiums were built in the 1970s on McEwen and Ambleside Drive, just north of Richmond Road. During. Woodpark was one of the communities in the west end to have a big development during that time. 
 
Woodpark is served by buses on Carling, Woodroffe and Richmond Road, and is adjacent to the Carlingwood Shopping Centre.

It is very close the NCC bike path along the Ottawa River.

This neighbourhood is also home to Ottawa mayor Jim Watson.

See also
List of Ottawa neighbourhoods

References

External reference 
 Woodpark Community Association website

Neighbourhoods in Ottawa